Anthidium tesselatum is a species of bee in the family Megachilidae, the leaf-cutter, carder, or mason bees.

Synonyms
Synonyms for this species include:
Anthidium helvolum Klug, 1832
Anthidium waltlii Spinola, 1838
Anthidium villosulum Smith, 1854
Anthidum signiferum Walker, 1871
Anthidum tesselatum var aegyptiacum Friese, 1897
Anthidium lanitarse Friese, 1917
Anthidium lanitarse lloydi Mavromoustakis, 1936
Anthidium lanitarse var zebra Benoist, 1950

References

tesselatum
Insects described in 1832
Taxa named by Johann Christoph Friedrich Klug